Darreh Chah (also Romanized as Darreh Chāh; also known as Dar Chāh) is a village in Kuri Rural District, in the Central District of Jam County, Bushehr Province, Iran. At the 2006 census, its population was 135, in 30 families.

References 

Populated places in Jam County